Scopula asymmetrica is a moth of the family Geometridae. It is endemic to Borneo. The habitat consists of alluvial forests, wet heath forests and lower montane forests on limestone.

Adults are grey brown.

References

Moths described in 1997
asymmetrica
Moths of Asia